Itauguá is a city of the Central Department, Paraguay. Founded in 1728, it is known by its peculiar art of the ñandutí and its music.

The San Rafael Museum shows various objects from the Colonial Age.

The National Hospital, one of the most important health institutions, is located in Itauguá.

Itauguá is about 30 kilometers away from Asunción. It was founded by Governor Martín de Barúa on June 27, 1728.

History and Toponymy
The architecture of the Colonial Age is still visible in the center of the city.

Its name is related to the Ytay stream, that flows through the land. So, "ita", which means "stone" in the Guaraní language, plus the suffix "gua", which indicates "belonging in Guaraní language".

Actually, Itauguá is denominated as the "City of the Ñandutí" because of its main artesian work, known by the similarity to the spider webs.

One of the most important cultural expressions is the "Ñandutí Festival" which has been attracting large audiences annually for over 30 years. The first edition was in June 1970. Great artists who have participated in the festival include Juan Cancio Barreto, Grupo Generación, Quemil Yambay, Vocal Dos, Oscar Pérez and his band, also the famous band of Juan Carlos Oviedo and the Acuña Brothers.

The city possesses a supply of drinkable water across Meetings of Environmental Reparation and does not possess sanitary sewer. It  possesses, in addition, the polysport "Dr. Nicolás Léoz"

Demography 

Itauguá has 89,449 inhabitants, from which 44,997 are males and 44,451 females, according to the General Office of Statistics, Polls and Census.

Tourism

Among the touristic attractions are the hills Patiño and Cerrito, the Virgen del Rosario Church, the San Rafael Museum, and the colonial houses built during the time of the former dictator Gaspar Rodríguez de Francia.

Climate

The climate is pretty fresh. The warm weather predominates with high temperatures during the spring and the summer.

Economy

Itauguá is characterized especially by the manufacture and sale of textiles of Ñandutí. This product is exported to many foreign countries. The tourists always show great interest in the ñandutí, considering it as an everlasting product which easily conquers international markets.

Neighborhoods and Companies

Here are some of its companies:

Aldama Cañada
Potrero
Virgen de Guadalupe
Guayaibity
San Antonio
Zeballos
Itaugua-Guazu
Mbocayaty
Cañada
Patiño

How to get there

You can get to the city of Itauguá following the Route 2. Coming from Asunción, there are many public buses which go to Itauguá. The route is thoroughly signalized.

Outstanding citizens

Itauguá is proud of its culture and music is one of the popular passions of the municipality. Several representative artists of Paraguayan music have "cradle itagueña". Important people born in Itaguá include Félix Fernandez, known by his poems in Guarani, Vicente yankee Cardozo, Fernanda parranda Baez (consumidora de cocido) rocio, the writer Nicolás Cóppulo, and Juan Crisóstomo Centurión, hero of the Paraguayan War and outstanding politician during the postwar. The city is also a cradle of important artists and musical groups such as Vocal Dos, Evolucion and others.

Art and culture

The city celebrates intensely near the end of June to remember its foundation. The festivals attract the attention of other cities through dances, music and performances by folkloric bands.

Ñanduti

Ñanduti is a lace weaved with needles tailored in circular frames. This fabric gives a very delicate detail to many clothes and decorates. It is mandatory to get to Itauguá to hear the legend of the Ñandutí which is told with pride by the inhabitants.

References

Reportaje al País. Tomo 1. Edición 2001. Asunción Paraguay.
Geografía Ilustrada del Paraguay -  - Distribuidora Arami S.R.L.
La Magia de nuestra tierra. Fundación en Alianza. Asunción. 2007.

External links

  SENATUR
World Gazeteer: Paraguay – World-Gazetteer.com

Populated places in the Central Department
Populated places established in 1728
1728 establishments in the Spanish Empire